Say Anything... is a 1989 American teen romantic comedy drama film written and directed by Cameron Crowe (in his feature directorial debut). The film follows the romance between Lloyd Dobler (John Cusack), an average student, and Diane Court (Ione Skye), the class valedictorian, immediately after their graduation from high school.

Say Anything... was theatrically released in the United States on April 14, 1989, by 20th Century Fox. The film received positive reviews from critics. In 2002, Entertainment Weekly ranked Say Anything... as the greatest modern movie romance, and it was ranked number 11 on Entertainment Weekly list of the 50 best high school movies.

Plot
At the end of their senior year of high school, noble underachiever Lloyd Dobler falls for valedictorian Diane Court and plans to ask her out, though they belong to different social groups.

Lloyd's parents are stationed in Germany for the Army, so he lives with his sister Constance, a single mother, and has no plans yet for his future. Diane comes from a sheltered academic upbringing, living with her doting divorced father Jim, who owns the retirement home where she works. She will take up a prestigious fellowship in England at the end of the summer.

Lloyd offers to take Diane to their graduation party. She agrees, to everyone's surprise. Their next "date" is a dinner at Diane's, where Lloyd fails to impress Jim, and the Internal Revenue Service informs the latter he is under scrutiny.

Diane introduces Lloyd to the retirement home residents and he teaches her to drive her manual transmission Ford Tempo graduation gift. They grow closer and become intimate, to her father's concern. Lloyd's musician best friend Corey, who has never gotten over her cheating ex-boyfriend, Joe, warns him to take care of Diane.

Jim urges Diane to break up with Lloyd, feeling he is not an appropriate match, and suggests she give Lloyd a pen as a parting gift. Worried about her father, Diane tells Lloyd she wants to stop seeing him and concentrate on her studies, giving him the pen. Devastated, he seeks advice from Corey, who tells him to "be a man". Meanwhile, Jim discovers his credit cards are declined as the investigation drags on.

At dawn, Lloyd plays "In Your Eyes" by Peter Gabriel, which was playing when they became intimate, on a boombox, standing under her open bedroom window. The next day, Diane meets with the IRS investigator, who says they have evidence incriminating Jim with embezzling funds from his retirement home residents. He suggests she accept the fellowship as matters with her father will worsen.

Diane finds the cash concealed at home and confronts Jim, who tells her he took it to give her financial independence. Jim feels justified in doing so as he provided better care of his residents than their families. Distraught, she reconciles with Lloyd at his kickboxing gym.

At the end of summer, Jim is incarcerated on a nine-month sentence. Lloyd visits him at the prison, saying he is going with Diane to England; Jim reacts with anger. Lloyd gives him a letter from Diane, but she arrives to say goodbye and they embrace. She gives him the pen she gave Lloyd, asking him to write to her in England. Lloyd comforts Diane, who is afraid of flying, on their flight.

Cast

 John Cusack as Lloyd Dobler
 Ione Skye as Diane Court
 John Mahoney as Jim Court
 Lili Taylor as Corey Flood
 Amy Brooks as D.C.
 Pamela Adlon as Rebecca
 Jason Gould as Mike Cameron
 Loren Dean as Joe
 Polly Platt as Mrs. Flood
 Bebe Neuwirth as Mrs. Evans
 Jeremy Piven as Mark
 Eric Stoltz as Vahlere
 Kim Walker as Sheila
 Chynna Phillips as Mimi
 Joan Cusack as Constance Dobler (uncredited)
 Philip Baker Hall as IRS Boss
 Joanna Frank as Mrs. Kerwin
 John Hillner as Court's Attorney
 Dan Castellaneta as Diane's teacher (uncredited)
 Lois Chiles as Diane's mother (uncredited)

Jennifer Connelly and Ione Skye vied for the role of Diane Court, but Skye was cast. Robert Downey Jr. was offered the role of Lloyd Dobler, but turned it down. Christian Slater and Kirk Cameron were also considered for the role. Dick Van Dyke and Richard Dreyfuss were considered for the role of Jim Court.

Soundtrack
AllMusic wrote that the soundtrack, like the film, is "much smarter than the standard teen fare of the era." The soundtrack consists of these songs:

Critical reception
On Rotten Tomatoes, the film has an approval rating of 98% based on 47 reviews, with an average rating of 8.10/10. The website's consensus reads, "One of the definitive Generation X movies, Say Anything is equally funny and heartfelt—and it established John Cusack as an icon for left-of-center types everywhere." On Metacritic the film has a score of 85 based on reviews from 18 critics, indicating "Universal acclaim". Audiences surveyed by CinemaScore gave the film a grade B+ on scale of A to F.

Chicago Sun-Times film critic Roger Ebert called Say Anything... "one of the best films of the year—a film that is really about something, that cares deeply about the issues it contains—and yet it also works wonderfully as a funny, warmhearted romantic comedy." He later included it in his 2002 Great Movie list, writing, "Say Anything exists entirely in a real world, is not a fantasy or a pious parable, has characters who we sort of recognize, and is directed with care for the human feelings involved."

The film also had detractors. Variety called it a "half-baked love story, full of good intentions but uneven in the telling." But, the review also said the film's "[a]ppealing tale of an undirected army brat proving himself worthy of the most exceptional girl in high school elicits a few laughs, plenty of smiles and some genuine feeling." In a mixed review, Caryn James of The New York Times wrote:
[The film] resembles a first-rate production of a children's story. Its sense of parents and the summer after high school is myopic, presented totally from the teenagers' point of view. Yet its melodrama—Will Dad go to prison? Will Diane go to England?—distorts that perspective, so the film doesn't have much to offer an actual adult, not even a sense of what it's truly like to be just out of high school these days. The film is all charming performances and grace notes, but there are plenty of worse things to be.

Cultural influence
The film features one of the most culturally recognizable scenes in American movie history, in which John Cusack holds a boombox above his head outside Diane's bedroom window to let her know that he has not given up on her. Crowe and producer James L. Brooks believed the scene could become a hallmark of the movie, though Crowe found it difficult to film because Cusack felt it was "too passive". The scene was first scored with Fishbone's "Question of Life", but after viewing the scene, Crowe opted to replace it with Peter Gabriel's "In Your Eyes" to better fit the mood that he wished to convey. Gabriel initially turned down Crowe because he confused the film with another film in production at the time, a John Belushi biography called Wired.

"That scene is like Romeo under the trellis," said Crowe reminiscing about the iconic scene. "But I have this feeling when I watch it that it's filled with double emotion – both with the story and the actors, whose own trepidation bleeds in."

Canceled TV series
A television series based on the movie was planned by NBC and 20th Century Fox, but producers Aaron Kaplan and Justin Adler did not know that Crowe had not approved of the project. When they found out his views, the show was dropped.

References

External links

 
 
 Say Anything...' says so much", Los Angeles Times, October 25, 2009.

20th Century Fox films
American coming-of-age comedy-drama films
American romantic comedy-drama films
American teen comedy-drama films
American teen romance films
Films directed by Cameron Crowe
Films produced by James L. Brooks
Films scored by Anne Dudley
Films scored by Richard Gibbs
Films set in Seattle
Films shot in Washington (state)
Films with screenplays by Cameron Crowe
Gracie Films films
1980s American films
1980s coming-of-age comedy-drama films
1980s English-language films
1980s romantic comedy-drama films
1980s teen comedy-drama films
1980s teen romance films
1989 comedy-drama films
1989 directorial debut films
1989 films